The Dade Correctional Institution (Dade CI or DCI) is a prison in unincorporated Miami-Dade County, Florida, near Florida City, and south of Homestead, in Greater Miami. It houses adult males. It opened in September 1996. It is a part of the Florida Department of Corrections, and is right next to the Homestead Correctional Institution which houses female inmates.

History

In 2003 Jerry Cummings, who had started working for the Florida prison system in 1974 and retired in 2000, rejoined FDOC and became the warden of Dade Correctional.

In 2005, three prisoners escaped for an hour and a half, but were captured and sent back to prison.

Controversies
In May 2014, Julie K. Brown of The Miami Herald wrote the first in a series of stories about violence and corruption at Dade CI and other prisons. She wrote that there had been constant accusations of poor treatment of mentally ill prisoners, poor conditions in the food preparation area, and other concerns.

In 2014 former Dade CI prisoner Harold Hempstead accused prison authorities of fatally torturing prisoner Darren Rainey by scalding him with 180 °F (82 °C) water in a shower for hours, resulting in his body being found with strips of skin burned off. At least eight other prisoners had also been subjected to a scalding shower within Dade's "Transitional Care Unit".

In July 2014 Mike Crews, the FDOC secretary, suspended the warden of the Dade Correctional institution and put him on paid leave. Later that month Cummings was fired. Les Odom became the new warden.

On Monday July 28, 2014 prison authorities discovered 35-year-old prisoner Lavar Valentin dead from strangulation. Valentin had expressed fear of his cellmate and authorities accused the cellmate of killing him.

Another escape occurred in November 2014. West Palm Beach police apprehended the escaped prisoner. This prisoner had a life sentence. Cummings said that he was not surprised by the fact that a prisoner had escaped, saying that he found guards derelict in duty in a surprise inspection. According to Cummings, "[Dade] is, by far, the most dangerous prison I’ve ever worked in."

On April 29, 2022, four correctional officers were arrested for the February beating death of Ronald Ingram during a prisoner transfer.  After a lengthy investigation, the Florida Department of Law Enforcement arrested Ronald Connor, Jeremy Godbolt, Christopher Rolon and Kirk Walton.  Ingram allegedly threw urine on a correctional officer and was beaten so severely he was carried to the transport van.  Ingram was found dead hours later in Ocala, Florida.

References

External links
 "Dade Correctional Institution." Florida Department of Corrections.
 "A Conceptual Land Use Plan for Dade Correctional Institution and Homestead Correctional Institution Dade County, Florida 2009-2019" (Archive). Florida Department of Corrections Land Management Section, Bureau of Procurement and Supply.

Prisons in Florida
Buildings and structures in Miami-Dade County, Florida
1996 establishments in Florida